Farid Ali may refer to:
Farid Ali (entrepreneur), Canadian entrepreneur
Farid Ali (actor) (1945–2016), Bangladeshi actor
Farid Ali (footballer) (born 1992), Ukrainian footballer
Farid Ali (singer) (1919–1981), Algerian singer